The 1988 ARFU Asian Rugby Championship was the 11th edition  of the tournament, and was played in Hong Kong. The 8 teams were divided in two pool, with final between the winner of both of them. South Korea won the tournament.

Tournament

Pool 1

Pool 2

Finals

Third Place Final

First Place Final

References

1988
1988 rugby union tournaments for national teams
International rugby union competitions hosted by Hong Kong
1988 in Hong Kong sport